Silvano Canonico (1937 – 29 September 2009) was an Italian sport shooter European Champion at individual senior level.

Death
Silvano Canonico died in an accident on 29 September 2009, at the age of 72, in Valtellina, near the city of Lomazzo where he resided. Went to look for mushrooms with a friend, he fell into the bank of a river.

References

External links
 

1937 births
2009 deaths
Trap and double trap shooters
Italian male sport shooters